Utes may refer to:

Ute people, indigenous people of North America
Students of the University of Utah
Utah Utes,  athletics team of the University of Utah
Útes, fictional island in the video game ARMA 2
Underground thermal energy storage (UTES)

See also
Ute (disambiguation)